Lushnjë District was one of the 36 districts of Albania, which were dissolved in July 2000 and replaced by 12 newly created counties. It was in the west of the country and 80 km south of Tirana, and its capital was the city of Lushnjë. Its territory is now part of Fier County: the municipalities of Lushnjë and Divjakë.

Administrative divisions
The district consisted of the following municipalities:

Allkaj
Ballagat
Bubullimë
Divjakë
Dushk
Fier-Shegan
Golem
Grabian
Gradishtë
Hysgjokaj
Karbunarë
Kolonjë
Krutje
Lushnjë
Remas
Tërbuf

References

Districts of Albania
Geography of Fier County